Aleksander Bożydar Żabczyński (24 July 1900 in Warsaw – 31 May 1958 in Warsaw), was a Polish stage and movie actor, one of the most popular actors during the interwar period in Poland.

Filmography
 Czerwony błazen (1926)
 Ziemia obiecana (1927)
 Dzikuska (1928)
 Janko Muzykant (1930)
 Głos serca (1931)
 Kobieta, która się śmieje (1931)
 Dzieje grzechu (1933)
 Córka generała Pankratowa (1934)
 Śluby ułańskie (Soldiers' Celibacy aka Ulan Weddings) (1934)
 Panienka z poste restante (1935)
 Manewry miłosne (Love Manoeuvres) (1935)
 Ada! To nie wypada! (Ada, Don't Do That!) (1936)
 Tajemnica Panny Brinx (Miss Brinx' Secret) (1936)
 Będzie lepiej (1936)
 Jadzia (1936)
 Pani minister tańczy (1937)
 A Diplomatic Wife (1937)
 Snow White and the Seven Dwarfs (1937) (Polish dubbing as Prince)
 Kobiety nad przepaścią (1938)
 Królowa przedmieścia (Queen of the Suburbs) (1938)
 Zapomniana melodia (1938)
 Żona i nie żona (1939)
 Sportowiec mimo woli (1939)
 Biały Murzyn (1939)
 Trzy serca (1939)
 Złota Maska (1939)

References

External links

Male actors from Warsaw
1900 births
1958 deaths
Polish male film actors
Polish male silent film actors
Polish male stage actors
Recipients of the Gold Cross of Merit (Poland)
Recipients of the Cross of Valour (Poland)
Polish cabaret performers
Burials at Powązki Military Cemetery
20th-century Polish male actors
20th-century comedians